Zubeir Ali Maulid (born 25 March 1968) is a Tanzanian CCM politician and Member of Parliament for the Kwamtipura constituency in the National Assembly of Tanzania since 2000. He was appointed the speaker of the Zanzibar House of Representatives in 2016.

References

Chama Cha Mapinduzi MPs
Tanzanian MPs 2010–2015
1968 births
Living people